Osminia is a genus of moths in the family Sesiidae.

Species
Osminia donahueorum Duckworth & Eichlin, 1983
Osminia ruficornis (Edwards, 1881)
Osminia albipilosa Eichlin, 1998
Osminia bicornicolis Duckworth & Eichlin, 1983
Osminia colimaensis Duckworth & Eichlin, 1983
Osminia exigua Eichlin, 1998
Osminia fenusaeformis (Herrich-Schäffer, 1852)
Osminia ferruginea Le Cerf, 1917
Osminia fisheri Eichlin, 1987
Osminia heitzmani Eichlin, 1998
Osminia phalarocera Duckworth & Eichlin, 1983
Osminia rubrialvus Eichlin, 1998
Osminia namibiana Kallies, 2004
Osminia gorodinskii (Gorbunov & Arita, 2001)

References

Sesiidae